The Cleburne Railroaders are a professional baseball team based in Cleburne, Texas, that plays in the American Association of Professional Baseball, an official Partner League of Major League Baseball. The team, which began play in 2017, plays its home games at The Depot at Cleburne Station.

History
A different team known as the Cleburne Railroaders played in the Texas League, where they won the 1906 championship. The team won the 1911 Texas-Oklahoma League championship. They played their home games at Gorman's Park, now part of Hulen Park.

The modern Railroaders were announced as an expansion franchise in the American Association on October 6, 2016. The team plays in the Depot, a new US$25 million stadium that was recognized as the fan-favorite independent stadium by Ballpark Digest in 2017.

On June 12, 2020, it was announced that the Railroaders were one of six teams that would not be participating in the 2020 American Association season due to the COVID-19 pandemic.

New ownership
The Cleburne Railroaders announced three new additions to their ownership group: Neil Leibman, Alan Miller, and Jon Ryan. Leibman is the Texas Rangers (baseball) Chief Operating Officer and President of Business Operations and owns multiple professional sports teams. Miller is the owner of COLLiDE Agency and Ryan is a former NFL player and are part owners of the Portland Pickles independent baseball team located in Oregon. These additions to the ownership team came about in 2021 and these three will help in preparation for the upcoming season.

New colors
The Railroaders colors have changed from orange and blue to colors that are inspired by the flag of Texas. The new colors are: caboose red, steel rail blue and whistle post white.

New uniforms
The Railroaders will have three uniforms for this upcoming 2021 season. The home uniform is a white jersey with 'Railroaders' script across the chest. The pants are white with red and navy piping, the numbers are red, and on the sleeve there are Gandy and American Association patches. The away jerseys consist of a grey jersey and grey pants with the same patches as the home uniforms on the sleeves. Lastly, there is the Heritage uniform which features a navy blue top and grey pants with stirrups mimicking the ones worn by the original Railroaders team back in 1906.

Gandy
Railroaders also introduced a new mascot to their team, known as Gandy. Gandy will join Spike, the original mascot, in representing the Railroaders and what they stand for. Gandy's background is that he was a part of the Santa Fe railroad track maintenance gang. These maintenance gangs were known as Gandy Dancers because they would sing a variety of songs while they were working on the track.

Season-by-season records

Roster

Notable alumni
 Mitch Glasser (2017)
 Shawn Zarraga (2017)
 Winston Abreu (2017)
 Rafael Palmeiro (2018)
 Ryan Brett (2019)
 Nefi Ogando (2019)
 Daniel Robertson (2019)
Bubby Rossman (2019)
 Ozzie Martínez (2021)
 Nick Gardewine (2021)
 Michael Mariot (2021)
 Logan Verrett (2021)

Further reading
Cleburne Baseball: A Railroader History by Scott Cain

References

External links

American Association of Professional Baseball teams
Tourist attractions in Johnson County, Texas
Professional baseball teams in Texas
2016 establishments in Texas
Baseball teams established in 2016
Texas–Oklahoma League teams